Manisa railway station is the main railway station in Manisa, Turkey. It is owned by the Turkish State Railways and is serviced by several regional and two inter-city trains daily. Just east of the station is a junction, where trains to Bandırma and Balıkesir split from the railway and head north. Manisa station was opened on 10 October 1865 by the Smyrna Cassaba Railway.

See also
Sivas station
Malatya station
Diyarbakır station

References

Railway stations in Manisa Province
Railway stations opened in 1865
1865 establishments in the Ottoman Empire
Art Deco railway stations
Manisa